My Country My Home is a 2018 Burmese drama film, directed by Kyi Phyu Shin starring Yan Aung, Aung Ye Lin, Wutt Hmone Shwe Yi, Win Morisaki and Noa Kawazoe. The film was produced by Shwe Thanlwin Media Film Production and premiered in Myanmar on July 27, 2018.

Synopsis
Nan was born and raised in Tokyo but her family is from Myanmar. When Nan know that she was stateless and his father is planning to take her home with him, she is shocked but she know from her mother's diary that her father and mother had been involved in the 8888 Uprising about 30 years ago and had immigrated to Japan as a refugee. As told of Burmese-born Japanese singer Aung Kimura, she understood everything and she decided to go to Myanmar, where his relatives live.

Cast
Yan Aung as U Sai Mai Son
Aung Ye Lin as Thura
Wutt Hmone Shwe Yi as Nan Hatt Khay
Win Morisaki as Aung Kimura 
Noa Kawazoe as Miyuki
Chiharu Ogoshi as Sakura

References

2018 films
2010s Burmese-language films
Burmese drama films
Films shot in Myanmar
2018 drama films